The 2023 Hawai'i Rainbow Warriors volleyball team represents the University of Hawaiʻi at Mānoa (UH) in the 2023 NCAA Division I & II men's volleyball season. The Rainbow Warriors, led by 14th-year head coach Charlie Wade, play home games at Stan Sheriff Center on the UH campus in the Honolulu neighborhood of Mānoa. The Rainbow Warriors, members of the Big West Conference, were picked by Big West coaches to win the conference in its preseason poll with Long Beach State. The Rainbow Warriors enter the season as the two-time defending national champions after defeating Long Beach State in the 2022 national championship game. The national championship was Hawai'i's second men's volleyball national championship after they had to vacate the 2002 national championship.

Season highlights
Will be filled in as the season progresses.

Preseason

Coaches poll 
The preseason poll was released on December 21, 2022. Hawaii was picked to finish first in the Big West Conference standings.

Roster

Schedule
TV/Internet Streaming information:
All home games will be televised on Spectrum Sports. All conference road games will be streamed on ESPN+ or the respective schools streaming service.

 *-Indicates conference match.
 Times listed are Hawaii Time Zone.

Announcers for televised games
Ball State: Kanoa Leahey, Chris McLachlin, & Ryan Tsuji
Ball State: Kanoa Leahey, Chris McLachlin, & Ryan Tsuji
St. Francis: Kanoa Leahey, Chris McLachlin, & Ryan Tsuji
St. Francis: 
Queens: 
Belmont Abbey: 
Barton: 
Stanford: 
Stanford: 
Concordia Irvine: 
Concordia Irvine: 
LIU: 
LIU: 
Pepperdine: 
Pepperdine: 
Purdue Fort Wayne: 
Penn State: 
UCLA: 
Long Beach State: 
Long Beach State: 
CSUN: 
CSUN: 
UC Santa Barbara: 
UC Santa Barbara: 
UC Irvine:  
UC Irvine: 
UC San Diego: 
UC San Diego:

Rankings 

^The Media did not release a Pre-season or Week 1 poll.

References

2023 in sports in Hawaii
2023 NCAA Division I & II men's volleyball season
2023 Big West Conference men's volleyball season